Senator Pettibone may refer to:

Charles Pettibone (1841–1925), Wisconsin State Senate
John Owen Pettibone (1787–1876), Connecticut State Senate